Kelly Christine Ross (born 10 February 1979) is a former Australian rugby union player. Originally from the United States, she represented  at the 2010 Women's Rugby World Cup, they finished in third place.

References

External links 

 Classic Wallabies Profile

1979 births
Living people
Australia women's international rugby union players
Australian female rugby union players
Rugby union locks